Allied bombing of Yugoslavia may refer to:

Allied bombing of Yugoslavia in World War II (1943–1944)
NATO bombing of Yugoslavia (1999)